"All Right" is a song written and sung by Faron Young and released on the Capitol label (catalog no. 3169). In August 1955, it peaked at No. 2 on Billboards country and western disk jockey chart. It spent 28 weeks on the charts and was also ranked No. 10 on Billboards 1955 year-end country and western disk jockey chart and No. 16 on the year-end juke box chart.

See also
 Billboard Top Country & Western Records of 1955

References

Faron Young songs
1955 songs